The Tapiche Reserve is a private conservation property located in Tapiche District, Requena Province, Loreto Region in Peru. The reserve is designated by the Peruvian government as a Private Conservation Area (PCA).

Geography 
The reserve encompasses an area of approximately 1,540 hectares, in the Tapiche River basin, spanning both sides of the river east of the Ucayali River. It is located 340 km up river from Iquitos on the Tapiche River, and is accessible only by waterway. The Blanco and Umaita Rivers empty into the Tapiche River in the basin area. Other tributaries are the Contea, Capanahua, and Lamayacu Rivers.

The reserve comprises several types of lowland Amazonian forests, including igapo, varzea, and terra firme. It is one of the few areas in the Amazon basin where these forest types can be found in close proximity.  The Tapiche River basin in the area of the reserve exhibits a landscape containing alluvial plains and associated floodplains. The floodplains of the alluvial landscape encompass swamps or aguajales; while the non-flooded plains appear as undulating terraces. There are hilly landscapes within the reserve which appear as gently sloping lowland terrain. Swamps have developed on flat land and in depressions formed by fibric histosol soils with pH values varying between 3.5 and 5.

Hydrography 
The Tapiche River is regarded as a "black water" river because of its dark sepia waters. Possessing little material in suspension, its color comes from the decomposition of organic material forming humic and fulvic acids. These waters are acidic, with pH around 4.0 and a temperature from 24 °C (75 °F) to 32.0 °C (90 °F). The Tapiche River has a strictly sub-Andean and origin, which eliminates a direct relationship with rainfall in the mountains. Within the reserve there are small bodies of water (oxbows, channels, meanders, restingas and lakes) that communicate with each other and with the Tapiche River. Channels that connect curved river-bends create navigable shortcuts during flooded season. The largest internal body of water is called Quebrada Chambiria. Quebrada Chambiria has little flow which creates habitat for a host of species.

Climate 
It has annual temperatures ranging from 25 °C (77 °F) to 33 °C (91 °F) with relative humidity of 78% to 96%. In the rainy season from October to May there is tropical rainfall. The average annual precipitation is 3 meters. During the months of June or July a particular weather phenomenon called a "cold spell" occurs in the region. The cold spell is related to penetration of air masses coming from the southern polar latitudes and entering the South American tropics shortly after reaching Southeast Brazil. This cold spell lasts about 2–4 days, where temperatures can reach 13 °C (55 °F).

Biology and ecology

Fauna 
The reserve is home to endangered species such as jaguar (Panthera onca), bald uakari (Cacajao calvus), giant armadillo (Priodontes maximus), the Brazilian tapir (Tapirus terrestris), the Amazonian manatee (Trichechus inunguis), and harpy eagle (Harpia harpyja). A land survey and rapid species inventory of Tapiche Ohara's Reserve was performed in 2011. The species inventory is reproduced below in table format.

Flora 
Trees such as cedar (Cedrela odorata) and mahogany (Swietenia macrophylla) can be found in its forests. There four representative botanical families in its swamps, including: Moraceae, Fabaceae, Annonaceae and Arecaceae. Also found are catahua (Hura crepitans), strangler fig (Ficus sp.), machimango (Eschweilera sp.), and caupuri (Virola pavonis), aguaje (Mauritia flexuosa), shapaja (Attalea phalerata), cashapona (Socratea exorrhiza), renaco (Ficus trigona), espintana (Oxandra espintana) and huimba (Pachira aquatica).

Aquatic ecosystems 
The reserve houses ecosystems formed by conditions that create microhabitats. The ecosystems present on the reserve encompass cochas and tahuampas. Primary plant species found in these aquatic ecosystems are species belonging to the family Poaceae; especially the Gramalote blanco (Paspalum fasciculatum) and others of the genera Echinochloa and Paspalum. Also present is caña brava (Gynerium sagittatum), water hyacinth (putu putu, Eichhornia crassipes), and huama (Pistia stratiotes).

Table of flora (2011)

Table of Fauna (2011)

References 

 AMAZONÍA Guia Ilustrada de Flora y Fauna, Proyecto Araucaria XXI Nauta. November 2009 http://www.aeci.org.pe/publicaciones/store/pub.19.pdf
 Cronquist, A. (1981) An Integrated System of classification of flowering plants. Columbia University Press, New York.
 Kembo, C. (1995) Diagnosis of plant resources in the Peruvian Amazon - IIAP October 1995, Technical Paper No 16 – Iquitos, Peru.
 Peruvian Law N º 26834 - Law of Natural Protected Areas and Rules - approved by Supreme Decree 038-2001-AG, established the National Institute of Natural Resources (INRENA). INRENA is the governing body and national authority of the National System of Protected Natural Areas by the State (SINANPE).
 Departmental Resolution No. 059-2004-INRENA approving the Supplementary Provisions to the Regulations of the Law of Natural Protected Areas on Private Conservation Areas.
 Peruvian Supreme Decree N º 016 - 2009 - MINAM. Plan for Natural Protected Areas.

External links 

 Convention on International Trade in Endangered Species of Wild Fauna and Flora.
 IUCN Red List of Threatened Species.
 IIAP - Instituto de Investigaciones de la Amazonía Peruana
 Siamazonía - Sistema de Información de la Diversidad Biológica y Ambiental de la Amazonía Peruana
 A tour operator website with visitor information
 Peruvian Amazon
 Iquitos, Peru Wikipedia.

Nature reserves
Protected areas of Peru
Geography of Loreto Region